Deicide is the killing of a god.

Deicide may also refer to:

 Deicide (band), an American death metal band
 Deicide (album), their eponymous 1990 album
 Jewish deicide, a historic belief which claimed that the Jewish people were collectively responsible for the death of Jesus.
 Decide!, an Italian libertarian political association.